Larnelle Steward Harris (born July 6, 1947) is an American gospel singer and songwriter. During his 40-plus years of ministry, Harris has recorded 18 albums, won five Grammy Awards and 11 Dove Awards, and has had several number one songs on the inspirational music charts.

Early life

A native of Danville, Kentucky, Harris started playing the drums at the age of nine. His first formal vocal training came when he attended college at Western Kentucky University, from which he graduated in 1969. Harris then became a part of the popular gospel touring group The Spurrlows (beginning as drummer). He received notability for his solo work and as member of the Gaither Vocal Band from 1984 through 1987.

Music

Perhaps Harris' best-known songs are his duets with Sandi Patty, "More than Wonderful" (1983) and "I've Just Seen Jesus" (1985).  Others of his well received and popular songs are his self-penned "I Miss My Time With You" (1986) and "In It After All", written by Constant Change, a.k.a. Dawn Thomas, on his album I Can Begin Again (1989), on Benson Records. The song was a No. 1 radio hit.

Harris' song, "Mighty Spirit" was featured in a 1993 television campaign for the Points of Light Foundation, headed by President George H. W. Bush. He performed the song for Bush and his wife Barbara at the White House. His recording of "All Along the Way", co-written by Greg Nelson and Dan Schafer, reached the No. 1 spot on the CCM Inspirational chart, and stayed for five weeks. His 1995 album, Unbelievable Love, received the 1996 Dove Award as Inspirational Album of The Year.

Harris has received an honorary doctorate of music from Campbellsville University in central Kentucky. He was inducted into the Western Kentucky University Hall of Distinguished Alumni in 1993.

Television work

Harris has appeared live on television series such as Live with Regis and Kathie Lee, The 700 Club, several Billy Graham crusades, and the Trinity Broadcasting Network. He has appeared on numerous Gaither Homecoming shows, and his own Christmas special. In his hometown of Louisville, Kentucky, Harris has made many appearances on the WHAS Crusade for Children, a long-running local telethon benefitting children's charities.

Personal life

Harris met his wife Cynthia (Mitzi) while both were students at Western Kentucky University. They have two children Lonnie (Larnelle Jr.) and Teresa. They have lived in Louisville for more than three decades. Despite his schedule, Harris serves as a deacon in his home church, and previously served as its treasurer. Harris is well-known within the gospel music industry for his reluctance to schedule performances that take him away from his family for any length of time.

Discography

With First Gear
1972:  First Gear featuring Larnelle Harris (Myrrh 6505)
1974:  Caution!Steep Hill Use First Gear (Myrrh 6515)

Solo
1975: Tell It To Jesus
1977: Larnelle...More
1978: Free
1980: Give Me More Love in My Heart
1982: Touch Me Lord
1985: I've Just Seen Jesus
1986: From a Servant's Heart
1987: The Father Hath Provided
1988: Larnelle...Christmas
1989: I Can Begin Again
1990: Larnelle Live...Psalms Hymns & Spiritual Songs (with the Brooklyn Tabernacle Choir)
1992: I Choose Joy
1994: Beyond All the Limits
1995: Unbelievable Love (Dove Award, Inspirational Album of The Year)
1998: First Love
2001: A Story to Tell
2003: Pass the Love
2005: I Want to Be a Star
2017: Disturb Us, Lord

Compilations
1991: The Best of 10 Years, Vol. 1&2
1986: The Best of Larnelle

Appearances on other albums
1991: Live with Friends The Brooklyn Tabernacle Choir; "I Can Be Glad"
1992: Handel's Messiah: A Soulful Celebration
1993: The New Young Messiah; "Ev'ry Valley Shall Be Exalted", "Surely He Hath Borne Our Griefs"
1994: Promise Keepers: A Life That Shows; "In a Way That Matters"
1994: Stories & Songs of Christmas; "Silent Night"
1994: Saviour: The Story of God's Passion for His People (with Steve Green, Twila Paris, Wayne Watson, Wintley Phipps)
1995: Christmas Carols of the Young Messiah; "Amen"
1995: Master Pieces – Classic Songs Made New; "Just A Little Talk With Jesus" 
1995: Hymns & Voices; "It Is Well with My Soul", "The Lord's Prayer"
1996: Emmanuel: A Musical Celebration of the Life of Christ; "Rejoice Emmanuel"
1997: God With Us: A Celebration of Christmas Carols & Classics; "Go Tell It on the Mountain"
1998: Ralph Carmichael and Friends Live; "Here and Now I Believe"
2000: Vestal & Friends, Vol. 2 Vestal Goodman; "The Lamb Has Brought Us Home"

Video

1991: Larnelle Live: My Time With You (VHS)
1992: I Choose Joy (VHS)
1994: Sparrow TV Dinners (VHS) various artists; "Teach Me to Love", duet with Steve Green
2002: More Than the Music ...Live (VHS) various artists; "The Lord's Prayer"
2005: Timeless: Concert of Faith & Inspiration (various artists)
2013: Live in Nashville

Gaither Homecoming performances
1993: A Christmas Homecoming "Amen"
1996: Homecoming Texas Style "Amen"
1998: Down By The Tabernacle "I Go To The Rock"
1999: Kennedy Center Homecoming "America, the Beautiful", "I've Just Seen Jesus" duet with Sandi Patty
2002: God Bless America "Jesus Saves"
2002: Let Freedom Ring "More Than Wonderful" with Sandi Patty
2003: Going Home "Friends in High Places"
2004: Dottie Rambo with Homecoming Friends "I Go to the Rock"
2004: We Will Stand "Dream On"
2005: Israel Homecoming "Amen"
2005: Jerusalem Homecoming "I Walked Today Where Jesus Walked"
2009: Gaither Vocal Band Reunion Volume 1 "Your First Day in Heaven", "Can't Stop Talking About Him", "A Few Good Men"
2009: Gaither Vocal Band Reunion Volume 2 "Dream On", "Build An Ark", "The Love of God"
2011: Alaskan Homecoming "How Great Thou Art", "The Star-Spangled Banner"
2011: Majesty "I've Just Seen Jesus" with Ladye Love Smith
2011: Tent Revival Homecoming "I Don't Want to Get Adjusted"
2011: The Old Rugged Cross "His Eye Is on the Sparrow"

Awards and honors

Grammy Awards
1983: Best Gospel Performance by Duo or Group for "More Than Wonderful" with Sandi Patty
1985: Best Gospel Performance by Duo or Group for "I've Just Seen Jesus" with Sandi Patty
1985: Best Solo Gospel Performance for "How Excellent Is Thy Name"
1987: Best Gospel Performance, Male for The Father Hath Provided
1988: Best Gospel Performance, Male for Larnelle...Christmas

GMA Dove Awards
1981: Contemporary Gospel Album of the Year for Give Me More Love in My Heart
1983: Male Vocalist of the Year
1983: Inspirational Album of the Year for Touch Me Lord
1986: Inspirational Album of the Year for I've Just Seen Jesus
1986: Male Vocalist of the Year
1988: Songwriter of the Year
1988: Male Vocalist of the Year
1992: Inspirational Album of the Year for Larnelle Live...Psalms, Hymns & Spiritual Songs
1993: Inspirational Album of the Year for Generation 2 Generation
1996: Inspirational Album of the Year for Unbelievable Love

Inducted into the Gospel Music Association Foundation Hall of Fame on October 29, 2007

Other honors
 Silver Bell Award for Distinguished Public Service presented by Ad Council
 Cashbox Magazine Award for Contemporary Gospel Single of the Year for "I Can Begin Again"
 Stellar Award, Best Solo Performance by Male Contemporary for "The Father Hath Provided"
 Singing News Fan Award for Favorite Black Artist
 The Christian Music Hall of Fame (inducted in 2007)
 Western Kentucky University Hall of Distinguished Alumni – Inducted 1993

References

External links
 
 
 
 Videos

1947 births
Living people
20th-century American singers
20th-century Christians
21st-century American singers
21st-century Christians
African-American Christians
American gospel singers
American performers of Christian music
Grammy Award winners
Musicians from Louisville, Kentucky
Singers from Kentucky
Songwriters from Kentucky
Western Kentucky University alumni
Writers from Danville, Kentucky
20th-century African-American musicians
21st-century African-American musicians